Balabanlı can refer to:

 Balabanlı, Ayvacık
 Balabanlı, Üzümlü